St James Church, St. James' Church or St. James Chapel or St. James Parish Church may refer to:

Australia
St. James's Church, a historic church in Morpeth, New South Wales
St James' Church, Sydney, New South Wales
St James Anglican Church, Toowoomba, a church in Queensland
St James Parish Hall, Toowoomba, a parish hall
St James' Church, Greenough, Western Australia

Barbados
St. James Church, Barbados

Belgium
St. James' Church, Antwerp
St. James's Church, Bruges

Canada
St. James Anglican Church (Vancouver), Vancouver, British Columbia
Saint James United Church (Montreal), Quebec

Czech Republic 
Church of St. James (Brno)
Church of St. James the Greater (Prague)

Denmark
 St. James' Church, Copenhagen

Germany
The German name for St. James is Jacobus or Jakobus, meaning two apostles.
 St. Jakobus, Görlitz
 St. James' Church, Hamburg
 St. Jakobi, Kirchrode
 St. Jakob, Köthen
 St. Jacobi, Münster
 St. Jakob, Nuremberg
 St. James's Church, Rothenburg ob der Tauber
 St. Jakobus, Rüdesheim
 St. Jacobi, Werther

India
 St. James' Church, Kolkata
 St. James' Church, Delhi
 St. James' Church, Karnal

Ireland
 St James' Church, Dublin (Church of Ireland)
 St James' Church, Dublin (Roman Catholic)

Israel
 Church of St. James Intercisus, a church dedicated to James Intercisus

Jamaica
St James Parish Church, Jamaica

Malta
Church of St James, Valletta
Church of St James, Victoria Gozo
St James's Church, Żurrieq

New Zealand
St James Church, Franz Josef
St. James Church, Kerikeri, a historic church

Norway
St. James's Church, Bergen, a church in the city of Bergen

Pakistan
St. James Church, Lahore, a church in Pakistan

Singapore
St. James' Church, Singapore, an Anglican church on Leedon Road off Holland Road, Singapore

Slovakia
Basilica of St. James, Levoča

Slovenia
St. James's Church, Koper
St. James's church, Ljubljana

South Africa
St. James Church, Cape Town

Sri Lanka 
 St. James' Church, Nallur
 St James' Church, Vidathaltheevu

Sweden
 Saint James's Church, Stockholm

United Kingdom

England
St James' Church, Arnside, Cumbria
St James' Church, Altham, Lancashire
St James' Church, Audlem, Cheshire
St. James' Church, Barrow-in-Furness, Cumbria
St James' Church, Birkdale, Merseyside
St James' Church, Birkenhead, Merseyside
St James' Church, Briercliffe, Lancashire
St James' Church, Brindle, Lancashire
St James' Church, Bristol
St James' Church, Broughton, Salford, Greater Manchester
St James' Church, Brownhills, West Midlands
St James' Church, Burton-in-Kendal, Cumbria
St James' Church, Cardington, Shropshire
St James' Church, Charfield, Gloucestershire
St James' Church, Christleton, Cheshire
St James' Church, Church Kirk, Lancashire
St. James' Church, Clitheroe, Lancashire
St James' Church, Cooling, Kent
St James' Church, Daisy Hill, Greater Manchester
St James' Church, Dover, Kent (a ruin)
St. James's Church, East Cowes, Isle of Wight
St James' Church, Enfield Highway, Greater London
St James' Church, Gawsworth, Cheshire
St James' Church, Great Ormside, Cumbria
Grimsby_Minster, North East Lincolnshire
St James' Church, Hampton Hill, Greater London
St James' Church, Handsworth, West Midlands
Church of St James the Great, Haydock, Merseyside
St James' Church, High Melton, South Yorkshire
St James' Church, Ince, Cheshire
St. James' Church, Kingston, Isle of Wight
Church of St James, Kingswood, South Gloucestershire
St James the Less Church, Lancing, West Sussex
St James' Chapel, Lindsey, Suffolk
Church of St James, Liverpool
St. James's Church, Piccadilly, London
St James's, Spanish Place, London
St James' Church, Muswell Hill, London
St James' Church, Norlands, London
St James' Church, Longborough, Gloucestershire
St James' Church, Melsonby, North Yorkshire
St James' Church, New Brighton, Merseyside
St. James, Normanton, Nottinghamshire
St James' Church, Oldham, Greater Manchester
St.James' Church, Poole, Dorset
St James' Church, Poolstock, Greater Manchester
St James  Church, Quedgeley, Gloucester
St James's Church, Reading
St. James' Church, Ryde, Isle of Wight
St. James' Church, Seacroft, Leeds, West Yorkshire
St. James' Church, Standard Hill, Nottingham
St James' Church, Stanstead Abbotts, Hertfordshire
St James with Holy Trinity Church, Scarborough, North Yorkshire
St James' Church, Stirchley, Shropshire
Church of St James the Less, Sulgrave, Northamptonshire
St James' Church, Taunton, Somerset
St James' Church, West Derby, Liverpool
St James' Church, Whitehaven, Cumbria
St James' Church, Wrightington Bar, Lancashire
St. James' Church, Yarmouth, Isle of Wight
 St James Church, West Tilbury, Essex
St James' Parish Church, Wetherby, West Yorkshire

Scotland
St James Church, St Andrews

Wales
St James's Church, Manorbier, Pembrokeshire

United States

 St. James' Episcopal Church (Los Angeles, California)
 St. James' Episcopal Church (South Pasadena, California)
 St. James Episcopal Church, Mill Creek (Stanton, Delaware)
 St. James Episcopal Church (Oskaloosa, Iowa)
 St. James Church (Louisville, Kentucky)
 St. James' Parish (Lothian, Maryland) or St. James Church
 St. James Church (Monkton, Maryland)
 St. James Chapel (St. James, Missouri)
 St. James Church and Rectory (Callicoon, New York)
 St. James' Church (Cleveland, New York)
 St. James Chapel (Hyde Park, New York)
 St. James Episcopal Church (Hyde Park, New York)
 St. James' Episcopal Church (New York City)
 St. James Roman Catholic Church (Manhattan)
 St. James Church (Queens, New York)
 St. James Chapel (Stony Brook, New York)
 St. James Church (Goose Creek, South Carolina)
 St. James Church (Santee, South Carolina)
 St. James Episcopal Church (Midvale, Utah)
 St. James Evangelical Lutheran Church, Milwaukee, Wisconsin
 St. James Church (Accomac, Virginia)
 St. James Church (Charlottesville, Virginia)

See also
 Cathedral of St. James (disambiguation)
 Church of St James and St Paul, Marton, Cheshire
 Church of St Philip and St James, Bentley, a church in Bentley, South Yorkshire
 St. Jakobus, Rüdesheim, a church in Germany
 St. James-Bond Church, Toronto, Ontario
 St. James Catholic Church (disambiguation)
 St. James Episcopal Church (disambiguation)
 St. James Lutheran Church (disambiguation)
 St James the Less and St Helen Church, Colchester
 St James Garlickhythe, London
 St Jax Montréal, Quebec
 St Margaret and St James' Church, Long Marton, Cumbria
 St Philip and St James Church (disambiguation)